Daylight Saving is a comedy by Nick Enright about a married couple living in north Sydney. It was one of Enright's most popular works.

References

External links
Daylight Saving at AusStage

Australian plays
1989 plays